Craig Charron (November 15, 1967 – October 19, 2010) was an American professional ice hockey center from North Easton, Massachusetts.  He attended the University of Massachusetts Lowell, where he played for four seasons and served as captain of the 1989-1990 team, finishing his collegiate career as the second-leading scorer in the program's Division I history with 64 goals in 142 career games.

He was drafted by the Montreal Canadiens in the 1989 NHL Supplemental Draft; however, he never appeared in a game in the National Hockey League.  He was a prolific player in the American Hockey League for many seasons, and he was the highest-scoring player on the 1995–96 Rochester Americans team which won the Calder Cup.

At the time of his death, he was the coach of the Spencerport Rangers High School Hockey team. During his first season as head coach Spencerport had made many strides but lost to the eventual state champions Webster-Thomas in the second round of sectionals.

Charron died at age 42 on October 19, 2010 after a battle with stomach cancer. He was inducted into the Legends of Lowell Hall of Fame by UMass Lowell and honored at the Tsongas Center at the University of Massachusetts Lowell on October 22, 2010. He was the nephew of 1980 U.S. Olympic goalie Jim Craig.

Career statistics

References

External links

Goriverhawks.com

1967 births
2010 deaths
People from Easton, Massachusetts
Albany Choppers players
American men's ice hockey centers
Birmingham Bulls (ECHL) players
Cincinnati Cyclones (IHL) players
Cincinnati Cyclones (ECHL) players
Cornwall Aces players
Dayton Bombers players
Fort Wayne Komets players
Fredericton Canadiens players
Kalamazoo Wings (1974–2000) players
Lowell Lock Monsters players
Montreal Canadiens draft picks
Rochester Americans players
St. John's Maple Leafs players
UMass Lowell River Hawks men's ice hockey players
Winston-Salem Thunderbirds players
National Hockey League supplemental draft picks
Deaths from stomach cancer
Deaths from cancer in New York (state)
Ice hockey players from Massachusetts
Los Angeles Blades players